Blåhø or variations thereof may refer to:

Blåhøa, mountain in Oppdal, Norway
Blåhøe, mountain in Skjåk, Norway
Blåhøi, mountain in Lesja, Norway
Blåhø (Vågå), mountain in Vågå and Dovre, Norway
Blåhøin, mountain in Dovre, Norway